Xenotrachea auroviridis is a species of moth of the family Noctuidae. It is found in India (including Bengal).

References

Moths described in 1867
Hadeninae